Wólka Lubielska  is a village in the administrative district of Gmina Rząśnik, within Wyszków County, Masovian Voivodeship, in east-central Poland.

External links
 Jewish Community in Wólka Lubielska on Virtual Shtetl

References

Villages in Wyszków County